The Green Shack was a restaurant located on Fremont Street in Las Vegas, Nevada that is listed on the United States National Register of Historic Places. It was opened by Mattie Jones and was famous for its fried chicken.

History 
Opened in 1929 and known as the Colorado when it opened on Christmas Eve 1929, the Green Shack had previously been the Swanky Club. With the addition of an old Union Pacific Railroad barracks for expansion, it was renamed Green Shack in 1932. The green paint on the addition was the source of the new name.

The building was listed on the National Register of Historic Places on June 3, 1994.

The Green Shack closed in May 1999 by Jim and Barbara McCormick who were the owners, and was demolished several years later. When it closed, the Green Shack was the oldest restaurant in Las Vegas.

See also
 List of restaurants in the Las Vegas Valley

References

Sources 
Roadside Peek

Demolished buildings and structures in Clark County, Nevada
National Register of Historic Places in Las Vegas
Restaurants in the Las Vegas Valley
Buildings and structures in Las Vegas
Restaurants established in 1929
Commercial buildings on the National Register of Historic Places in Nevada
1929 establishments in Nevada
Restaurants on the National Register of Historic Places
1999 disestablishments in Nevada
Buildings and structures demolished in 1999